Attila Kuttor (born 29 May 1970) is a Hungarian football manager, and former player who is the manager of Mezőkövesd. Being capped 546 times in the Hungarian League he is the all-time record holder. As a result of his outstanding performances he has been the highest paid football player in Hungary.

Manager career
In 2015, he was the coach of Haladás Szombathely. After the dismissal of Újpest FC manager Nebojša Vignjević he became the longest serving manager in the 2019–20 Nemzeti Bajnokság I. From 2021 to 2022 he was head coach of Vasas SC. On 14 September 2022, he was appointed new head coach of Mezőkövesdi SE. He had previously coached the team from 2017 to 2020.

Honours
MTK Hungária FC
Hungarian National Championship I winner: 1
 1996/97
Hungarian Cup winner: 3
 1996/97, 1997/98, 1999/00

FC Fehérvár
Hungarian Cup winner: 1
 2005/06

Szombathelyi Haladás
Hungarian National Championship I third place: 1
 2008/09

References 

1970 births
Living people
Sportspeople from Miskolc
Hungarian footballers
Association football defenders
Hungary international footballers
Diósgyőri VTK players
Fehérvár FC players
Győri ETO FC players
MTK Budapest FC players
Debreceni VSC players
BFC Siófok players
Szombathelyi Haladás footballers
Hungarian football managers
Mezőkövesdi SE managers
Nemzeti Bajnokság I managers
Vasas SC managers